Live at Sweet Basil is a live album by Canadian jazz pianist Paul Bley recorded in 1988 at the Sweet Basil Jazz Club and released on the Italian Soul Note label.

Reception
The Allmusic review awarded the album 3 stars.

Track listing
All compositions by Paul Bley except as indicated
 "Blues Waltz" - 9:03 
 "Lover Man" (Jimmy Davis, Ram Ramirez, James Sherman) - 15:29 
 "When Will the Blues Leave?" (Ornette Coleman) - 11:00 
 "My Old Flame" (Sam Coslow, Arthur Johnston) - 11:10 
 "My Foolish Heart" (Ned Washington, Victor Young) - 8:39 
Recorded at Sweet Basil in New York City on March 1-6, 1988.

Personnel
 Paul Bley — piano 
 John Abercrombie — guitar
Red Mitchell — bass
Barry Altschul — drums

References

Black Saint/Soul Note live albums
Paul Bley live albums
1988 live albums